San Antonio station may refer to:

San Antonio station (Caltrain), a Caltrain station in Mountain View, California
San Antonio station (Medellín), a Medellín Metro station in Colombia
San Antonio station (Texas), an Amtrak station in San Antonio, Texas
San Antonio metro station (Mexico City), in Mexico City, Mexico
San Antonio metro station (Panama), in Panama City, Panama
San Antonio Abad metro station, in Mexico City, Mexico
Kukullaga (Bilbao metro), Spanish station formerly named San Antonio-Etxebarri

See also
San Antonio (disambiguation)